Jeffrey J. D. Altheer (born 9 March 1987) is a Dutch retired professional footballer, who played as a defender and midfielder.

Club career
Born in Rotterdam, Altheer began his career with Feyenoord; following a two-year loan spell with Excelsior, he left Feyenoord at the end of the 2008–09 season following the expiry of his contract. He then signed for Helmond Sport in August 2009, on an amateur basis. He signed a three-year contract with VVV-Venlo in May 2012 and joined Willem II in summer 2015.

In April 2016 Altheer signed with ASWH, where he finished his football career in October that year. Since 2021, he plays for VV Lekkerkerk.

International career
Altheer was a Dutch youth international, representing Netherlands at under-18, under-19, and under-21 levels.

References

1987 births
Living people
Footballers from Rotterdam
Dutch footballers
Association football central defenders
Association football midfielders
Feyenoord players
Excelsior Rotterdam players
Helmond Sport players
VVV-Venlo players
Willem II (football club) players
Eredivisie players
Eerste Divisie players
ASWH players